Michael Bousselot is an American attorney, political advisor, and politician serving as a member of the Iowa Senate from the 21st District. Previously, he was a member of the Iowa House of Representatives, representing the 37th district. He originally assumed office on September 15, 2021 after a special election.

Early life and education 
Bousellot earned a Bachelor of Business Administration in accounting and a Master of Accountancy from the University of Iowa, followed by a Juris Doctor from the Drake University Law School.

Career 
Bousselot began his career as a consultant at Deloitte. He then served as a legal advisor to Governor Terry Branstad and Lieutenant Governor Kim Reynolds. During his tenure in the administration, Bousselot specialized in pension, tax, and health care, and local government policy. From 2015 to 2017, he served as chief of staff for Governor Brandstad. In 2017 and 2018, he was managing director of the Summit Agricultural Group. He was also the assistant vice president of Innovative Captive Strategies. In February 2021, Bousellot was appointed to serve as director of the Iowa Department of Management. He was elected to the Iowa House of Representatives in September 2021.

References 

Living people
Iowa lawyers
University of Iowa alumni
Republican Party members of the Iowa House of Representatives
Year of birth missing (living people)
Drake University Law School alumni